The 1964 State College of Iowa Panthers football team represented the State College of Iowa in the 1964 NCAA College Division football season. The Panthers offense scored 269 points while the defense allowed 100 points.

Junior halfback Randy Schultz received first-team honors on the 1964 Little All-America college football team after tallying more rushing yards than all of the Panthers' opponents.

Schedule

Team players in the NFL
Running back Randy Schultz was drafted by the Cleveland Browns in the 5th round (74th overall) of the 1966 NFL Draft and was also drafted by the New York Jets in the 20th round (177th overall) of the AFL 1966 Draft.

References

State College of Iowa
Northern Iowa Panthers football seasons
North Central Conference football champion seasons
State College of Iowa Panthers football